The 1901 Andover by-election was held on 26 August 1901 after the death of the incumbent Conservative MP Bramston Beach.  The seat was retained by the Conservative candidate Edmund Faber.

References 

By-elections to the Parliament of the United Kingdom in Hampshire constituencies
August 1901 events
1901 elections in the United Kingdom
1901 in England
20th century in Hampshire
Andover, Hampshire